William Brantley Harvey Jr. (August 14, 1930 – December 12, 2018) was an American lawyer and politician in the state of South Carolina.

He was the son of W. Brantley Harvey Sr. (1893–1981), a lawyer in Beaufort, South Carolina and former member of the South Carolina House of Representatives and the South Carolina State Senate. Harvey attended The Citadel, The Military College of South Carolina, and afterward served in the United States Army. He received a law degree from the University of South Carolina, and was admitted to the bar in 1955. He then joined his father's law firm, Harvey & Battey. He was elected to the South Carolina House of Representatives as a Democrat in 1958, and served until 1975, when he was installed as Lieutenant Governor of South Carolina. He served in that position until 1979. Harvey later served on the  South Carolina Commission of Parks, Recreation and Tourism, as well as the South Carolina Department of Transportation.

Harvey died on December 12, 2018 at the age of 88. He was married to Helen and has two sons and three daughters.

References

1930 births
2018 deaths
The Citadel, The Military College of South Carolina alumni
University of South Carolina alumni
Lieutenant Governors of South Carolina
Democratic Party members of the South Carolina House of Representatives
People from Walterboro, South Carolina
People from Beaufort, South Carolina
Military personnel from South Carolina
20th-century American lawyers
20th-century American politicians